The George River is a river of Fiordland, New Zealand. It rises south of Lake Beddoes and flows westward into George Sound at Anchorage Cove.

See also
List of rivers of New Zealand

References

Land Information New Zealand - Search for Place Names

Rivers of Fiordland